This is a list of Italian dishes and foods. Italian cuisine has developed through centuries of social and political changes, with roots as far back as the 4th century BC. Italian cuisine has its origins in Etruscan, ancient Greek, and ancient Roman cuisines.
Significant changes occurred with the discovery of the New World and the introduction of potatoes, tomatoes, bell peppers and maize, now central to the cuisine but not introduced in quantity until the 18th century. The cuisine of Italy is noted for its regional diversity, abundance of difference in taste, and is known to be one of the most popular in the world, with influences abroad.

Pizza and spaghetti, both associated with the Neapolitan traditions of cookery, are especially popular abroad, but the varying geographical conditions of the twenty regions of Italy, together with the strength of local traditions, afford a wide range of dishes.

Dishes and foods
The cuisine of Italy has many unique dishes and foods.

Zuppe e salse (soups and sauces)

 Acquacotta – an Italian soup that was originally a peasant food. Historically, its primary ingredients were water, stale bread, onion, tomato and olive oil, along with various vegetables and leftover foods that may have been available.
 Agghiotta di lumache (Sicilian snail soup)
 Agliata
 Agrodolce
 Bagna càuda
 Capra e fagioli
 Cioppino broth based seafood stew, served with grilled bread
 Garmugia
 Ginestrata
 Grine sauce
 Maccu
 Sugo al Pomodoro
 Minestra di ceci
 Minestra di pasta con pesce
 Minestrone
 Pasta e fagioli
 Ragù alla bolognese
 Ragù alla napoletana
 Ragù alla salsiccia
 Ragù – a meat-based sauce commonly served with pasta
 Risi e bisi
 Sciusceddu
 Stracciatella
 Boreto
 Fonduta
 Minestra di fagioli
 Pesto

Pane (bread)

 Bari
 Bozza pratese
 Casatiello
 Ciabatta – an Italian white bread made from wheat flour, water, salt, olive oil, and yeast, created in 1982 by a baker in Adria, Veneto, Italy, in response to popularity of French baguettes
 Ciaccino
 Ciriola – typical bread of Rome
 Colomba Pasquale
 Coppia Ferrarese
 Cornetto
 Crescentina
 Crescia
 Crocchè
 Farinata
 Ficattola
 Focaccia
 Fragguno
 Grissini torinesi
 Michetta – typical bread of Milan
 Moddizzosu
 Muffuletta
 Neccio
 Pandoro
 Pane carasau
 Pane casareccio
 Pane di Altamura
 Pane di Genzano (Lazio)
 Pane pugliese
 Pane di Laterza
 Pane di Matera
 Pane rustico – traditional crusty peasant bread
 Pane toscano – without salt
 Panelle di ceci
 Panettone
 Panino
 Penia
 Piadina
 Pita – typical bread of Catanzaro
 Rosetta – typical bread of Rome
 Schiacciata
 Taralli
 Testarolo
 Tigella
 Tortano
 Torta salata

Common pizzas

 Ai frutti di mare – an Italian seafood pizza that may be served with scampi, mussels or squid
 Calzone – folded over dough usually filled with ricotta and other ingredients
 Focaccia al rosmarino – a pizza based on rosemary and olive oil, sometimes served with prosciutto, usually served as appetizer
 Pizza ai funghi e salsiccia – pizza with mushroom and sausage or boscaiola, with mozzarella, mushrooms and sausages, with or without tomato
 Pizza al taglio – (Italian for pizza by the slice — literally "by the cut") is a variety of pizza baked in large rectangular trays, and generally sold in rectangular or square slices by weight, with prices marked per kilogram or per 100 grams. This type of pizza was invented in Rome, Italy, and is common throughout Italy.
 Pizza ai quattro formaggi – (four cheese pizza) with four different cheeses, typically Parmesan, Gorgonzola, Ricotta and Mozzarella (sometimes melted together, sometimes in sectors), with (rossa, red) or without tomato sauce (bianca, white)
 Pizza alla napoletana (or Neapolitan) – tomato, mozzarella and anchovy
 Pizza capricciosa – with tomato, mozzarella, mushrooms, artichokes, black and green olives
 Pizza Margherita – tomato and mozzarella
 Pizza marinara – tomato, oregano and garlic
 Pizza pugliese – tomato, mozzarella and onions
 Pizza quattro stagioni (four seasons pizza) – based on tomato and divided in four sectors, one for each season:
 Pizza romana (Roman pizza) – tomato, mozzarella, capers and anchovy
 Pizza siciliana (Sicilian pizza and Sfincione / sfinciuni) – tomato, mozzarella, capers, olive and anchovy

Pasta varieties

 Agnolotti
 Bavette, bigoli, bucatini
 Cannelloni, crespelle
 Capellini
 Cappelletti
 Chitarra
 Conchiglie
 Ditalini
 Eliche
 Farfalle, festoni, fettuccine, filatieddi, fusilli
 Garganelli
 Gnocchi
 Gnocchi di semolino – dumplings made with semolina flour
 Lasagna, linguine, lumache (snails), lasagnette
 Maccheroni (macaroni), malloreddus (Sardinian pasta), maltagliati, marille, marrubini
 Offelle, orecchiette
 Orzo
 Paccheri, paglia e fieno, pansotti, panzarotti, pappardelle, penne, perciatelli, pici, pinzillacchere, pizzoccheri,
 Ravioli, rigatoni
 Spaghetti, spaghetti alla chitarra, strozzapreti, strangozzi, strascinati
 Stelline – means "little stars" in Italian. The pasta is shaped like small stars.
 Testaroli – sometimes served with pesto
 Tacconi, tagliatelle, tagliarini, tonnarelli, tortellini, trenette, trottole, trofie
 Vermicelli
 Ziti

Pasta dishes

 Bucatini all'Amatriciana, Bucatini coi funghi, Bucatini alla Sorrentina
 Cannelloni al ragù, Cannelloni ai carciofi
 Carbonara
 Ciceri e Tria
 Cacio e pepe
 Fettuccine Alfredo
 Lasagne
 Linguine alle vongole -  with clam sauce
 Pansotti alla genovese – a type of huge ravioli
 Pasta all'Ortolana
 Pasta al pesto
 Penne all'arrabbiata
 Pasta con i peperoni cruschi
 Pasta con le sarde
 Ravioli
 Rigatoni con la Pajata, Rigatoni al forno con salsa aurora
 Spaghetti alla Carrettiera, Spaghetti al nero di seppia, Spaghetti alla Puttanesca, Spaghetti con la bottarga, Spaghetti all'aglio, olio e peperoncino, Spaghetti indiavolati, Spaghetti Siracusani, Spaghetti alla carbonara, Spaghetti allo scarpariello
 Tagliatelle alla boscaiola, Tagliatelle ai carciofi, Tagliatelle ai funghi, Tagliatelle al pomodoro, Tagliatelle al sugo di lepre, Tagliatelle al ragù
 Tortelloni alla zucca
 Tortellini, Cjarsons
 Tortelloni ricotta and spinaci
 Trofie al pesto, Trofie al sugo di noci
 Tumact me tulez
 Ziti

Rice dishes

Rice (riso) dishes are very common in Northern Italy, especially in the Lombardia and Veneto regions, though rice dishes are found throughout the country.

 Arancini
 Insalata di riso
 Pomodori col riso
 Risi e bisi – rice and peas
 Riso al nero di seppia
 Riso alla toscana
 Riso con i porcini
 Riso e indivia
 Riso tonnato
 Riso valdostano
 Risotto
 Risotto ai gamberoni
 Risotto ai quattro sapori
 Risotto al Barolo
 Risotto al cavolfiore
 Risotto al Gorgonzola – risotto prepared with Gorgonzola cheese
 Risotto alla marinara
 Risotto alla milanese – risotto with saffron
 Risotto alla sbirraglia
 Risotto alla zucca
 Risotto allo zafferano con petto d'anatra
 Risotto con agoni
 Risotto con la lüganega
 Risotto con scamorza e champagne
 Risotto di seppie alla veneziana
 Risotto indivia e fiori di zucca
 Risotto saltato
 Sformato al basilico
 Sformato di riso dolce
 Tiella di riso, patate e cozze

Pesce (fish dishes)

 Acciughe fritte in pastella
 Acciughe in carpione
 Acqua pazza
 Acquadella o latterino fritto
 Agghiotta di pesce spada
 Alici, sardine, anguilla marinate
 Anguilla marinata – marinated eel
 Baccalà
 Baccalà alla lucana
 Baccalà alla vicentina
 Baccalà fritto
 Baccalà mantecato
 Boreto alla graisana
 Branzino al sale
 Brodetto di arselle
 Buridda
 Cacciucco
 Calamaretti fritti – fried squid
 Calamari in zimino
 Calamari ripieni
 Capesante alla veneziana
 Cappon magro
 Carpaccio di pesce
 Cartoccio di pesce spada
 Cozze alla tarantina
 Cozze fritte alla viareggina
 Cozze ripiene
 Filetti di baccalà
 Filetti di orata al cartoccio
 Fritata di bianchetti
 Fritto misto di pesce
 Frittura mista di pesce
 Grancevola alla veneziana
 Impanata di pesce spada
 Involtini di pesce
 Missultin e polenta
 Moscardini lessati alla genovese
 Murena fritta
 Nasello al forno – baked hake
 Orata arrosto
 Orate al forno
 Pepata di cozze
 Pesce a scabecciu
 Pesce al cartoccio
 Pesce alla pizzaiola
 Pesce spada alla siciliana
 Pesce spada arrosto in salmoriglio
 Polpettine di mare
 Sarde a beccafico – stuffed sardines
 Sarde arraganate (sarde con origano e pane)
 Sarde grigliate
 Sarde ripiene
 Sarde sfiziose panate
 Sardele in saor
 Sbroscia bolsenese
 Scampi a zuppetta
 Scampi gratinati
 Seppie col nero alla veneziana
 Seppie con i piselli
 Seppie ripiene
 Seppioline in umido
 Sogliole alla mugnaia
 Spiedini ai frutti di mare
 Spiedini di alici
 Spiedini di anguilla
 Stoccafisso alla genovese
 Stoccafisso alla ligure
 Tonno sott'olio
 Tortiera di cozze
 Totano imbottito
 Triglie alla livornese
 Zuppa di pesce

Carne (meat dishes and cured meats)

 Abbacchio alla Cacciatora
 Abbacchio brodettato
 Bistecca Fiorentina
 Braciole
 Braciolone
 Bresaola
 Brodo
 Cacciatore – refers to a meal prepared "hunter-style" with onions, herbs, usually tomatoes, often bell peppers, and sometimes wine.
 Capicollo
 Carne al piatto
 Carne Pizzaiola
 Ciabusco
 Coda alla vaccinara
 Cotechino friulano or Musèt
 Cotechino Modena
 Cotoletta alla milanese
 Cotoletta alla petroniana
 Fiorentina steak
 Culatello
 Goulash or gulash
 Guanciale (cured pork jowl)
 Lonza
 Mortadella
 Oca (goose)
 Osso buco
 Pancetta (bacon)
 Pezzetti di cavallo
 Porcaloca
 Prosciutto affumicato (smoked ham)
 Prosciutto cotto (cooked ham)
 Prosciutto crudo
 Prosciutto di Parma
 Prosciutto di San Daniele
 Rosticciana
 Scaloppine, of various varieties
 Salame
 Salsiccia (sausages) including Salsiccia cruda
 Saltimbocca alla Romana
 Soppressata
 Spezzatino
 Speck Alto Adige PGI
 Speck friulano di Sauris
 Straccetti, of various varieties
 Stigghiola
 Trippa alla Romana
 Veal Milanese
 Violino Valtell
 Vitello (veal)

Verdura (vegetables)

   Asparagi bianchi e verdi (asparagus)
 Caponata
 Carciofi alla Romana
 Ciambotta
   Crauti (sauerkraut)
 Panzanella – a Tuscan salad of bread and tomatoes, popular in the summer
 Peperonata
  Pestât
 Pinzimonio – Italian-style crudités
 Fried eggplant

Nut dishes
 Chestnut pie – has been documented back to the 15th century in Italy, in the book De honesta voluptate et valetudine ("On honourable pleasure and health") written by the Italian writer and gastronomist Bartolomeo Platina.

Vino (wines)

 Abruzzo
 Montepulciano d'Abruzzo
 Trebbiano d'Abruzzo
 Basilicata
 Aglianico del Vulture
 Grottino di Roccanova
 Matera
 Terre dell'Alta Val d'Agri
 Calabria
 Cirò
 Campania
 Aglianico del Taburno
 Campi Flegrei
 Falerno del Massico
 Fiano di Avellino
 Greco di Tufo
 Lacryma Cristi
 Solopaca
 Taurasi
 Emilia-Romagna
 Albana
 Bonarda
 Gutturnio
 Lambrusco
 Pignoletto
 Sangiovese
 Trebbiano
 Friuli-Venezia Giulia
 Friulano
  Pignolo
  Ramandolo
  Refosco dal peduncolo rosso
  Ribolla Gialla
  Schiopettino
  Tazzelenghe
  Verduzzo friulano
 Liguria
 Cinque Terre
 Lombardy (Lombardia)
 Oltrepò Pavese
 Barbera
 Bonarda
 Conero
 Franciacorta
 Sassella
 Grumello
 Inferno
 Marche
 Rosso Piceno Superiore
 Spumante Brut
 Valcalepio
 Verdicchio
 Piedmont (Piemonte)
 Acqui
 Alba
 Asti
 Barolo
 Carema Riserva
 Colli Tortonesi
 Gattinara
 Gavi
 Grignolino
 Langhe
 Monferrato
 Nebbiolo
 Nizza
 Ovada
 Apulia (Puglia)
 Malvasia
 Negroamaro
 Sardinia (Sardegna)
 Cagliari
 Cannonau
 Monti
 Nuragus
 Ogliastra
 Sicily (Sicilia)
 Cerasuolo di Vittoria
 Donna Fugata
 Etna DOC
 Noto
 Passito di Pantelleria
 Marsala
 Nero d'Avola
 Trentino
 Marzemino
 Tuscany (Toscana)
 Bolgheri
 Carmignano
 Chianti
 Colli Apuani
 Colli Etruria Centrale
 Colline Lucchesi
 Elba
 Montalcino
 Montescudaio
 Nipozzano
 Parrina
 Pitigliano
 San Gimignano
 Scansano
 Val di Chiana
 Val di Cornia
 Valdinievole
 Valle di Arbia
 Vino Nobile di Montepulciano
 Umbria
 Grechetto
 Orvieto
 Rosso di Montefalco
 Sagrantino
 Torgiano
 Veneto
 Amarone
 Bardolino
 Colli Euganei
 Conegliano Veneto
 Custoza
 Prosecco
 Soave
 Valdobbiadene
 Valpolicella

Formaggi (cheeses)

 Asiago
   Asino
 Bel Paese
 Bitto
 Bra
 Burrata
 Burrini
 Butirro
 Caciocavallo
 Cacioricotta
 Canestrato pugliese
 Caprino
 Casècc
 Casiello
 Castelmagno
 Casu modde
 Ciccillo
 Crescenza
   Crotonese
 Fiore Sardo
 Fontina
   Formadi frânt e Formadi salât
 Formai de Mut dell'Alta Valle Brembana
 Giuncata
 Gorgonzola
 Grana Padano
   Latteria
   Liptauer
   Malga
 Marzolino
 Marzotica
 Mascarpone
 Montasio
   Monte Re
 Monte Veronese
 Mozzarella
 Murazzano
 Paddraccio
 Parmigiano Reggiano (Parmesan)
   Pecorino di Fossa
   Pecorino friulano
 Pecorino romano
 Pecorino sardo
 Piacentinu
   Primo Sale
 Provolone
 Puzzone di Moena
   Quartirolo
 Ragusano
 Raschera
   Ricotta affumicata (Scuete fumade)
 Ricotta rifatta
 Ricotta salata
 Robiola
 Scamorza
 Slattato
   Squacquerone
 Stracchino
   Tabor
 Taleggio
 Toma
 Tumazzu

Cheese dishes
 Carrozza (sandwich)

Desserts and pastry

* Aceto dolce – fruit preserves made with vinegar, honey, and grape juice
 Anisette (cookie)
 Biscuit Tortoni
 Cannolo siciliano
 Cassata siciliana
 Ciarduna
 Crocetta of Caltanissetta
 Crostata
 Gelato (ice cream)
 Gianduiotto and gianduia – hazelnut chocolates or spread
 Granita
   Gubana
 Nocciolini di Canzo
 Panforte
 Panna cotta
 Pastiera
 Pignolata
 Pizzelle
 Profiterole
   Putizza and Pinza
 Semifreddo
 Sfogliatelle
 Spina santa
 Tiramisù
 Torta Bertolina
 Torta caprese
 Torta della nonna
 Torta delle rose
 Struffoli – tiny fritters held together with honey and decorated with multi-colored sprinkles
 Zabaglione
 Zuppa Inglese

Caffè (coffee)

 Bicerin – coffee, hot chocolate and whipped cream, only in Turin
 Caffè americano believed to have originated in World War II when American G.I.s in Italy would dilute espresso with hot water to approximate the coffee to which they were accustomed.
 Caffè corretto
 Caffè leccese or Caffè in ghiaccio – espresso over ice with addition of almond milk instead of sugar, typical in Salento
 Caffè lungo
 Caffè macchiato
 Caffè Moka, made with a moka pot
 Caffè alla napoletana, made with a caffettiera napoletana
 Caffè shakerato, an Italian sweet iced coffee drink.
 Caffelatte
 Latte macchiato, similar to a caffelatte, but with less coffee
 Cappuccino
 Espresso – known generally in Italy simply as caffè
 Granita
 Grolla dell'amicizia – coffee and grappa served in a traditional bulbous wooden loving cup, shaped like a multi-spouted teapot, and drunk in the Aosta Valley and Piedmont.
 Marocchino – similar to a small cappuccino, invariably served in a glass, and drunk mainly in Turin, in the whole Piedmont and in Milan; similar to the espressino.
 Ristretto
 Uovo sbattuto "con caffe".  A once popular high energy breakfast item enjoyed by children.

Famous dishes
 Baccalà alla Vicentina
 Bistecca alla fiorentina (Florentine beefsteak)
 Pollo alla cacciatora
 Carbonara
 Ossobuco
 Orecchiette con le cime di rapa
 Pasta e fagioli
 Pasta con le sarde
 Pesto
 Ragù alla bolognese – a meat-based sauce served with tagliatelle or other pasta; the American dish Spaghetti alla Bolognese derives from this.
 Tortellini

Unique dishes and foods by region

Friuli-Venezia Giulia

   Asino- cheese of Carnic Prealps
  or Brovade – cooked turnips that were preserved in marc
   Cjarsons – sort of tortellini with a ricotta filling, of the Carnic Alps
   Cuguluf – leavened cake of Viennese origin
   Formadi frânt" and Formadi salât – cheeses
 Frico – sliced cooked potatoes with onions and Montasio cheese
   Gubana – cake made with a very rich filling of dry fruits, raisins and candied citron
   Kipfel – small fried crescent, made with a kind of potato dumpling dough
   Montasio – cheese of the Friuli
 Prosciutto di San Daniele DOP, famous ham exported all over the world
   Scuete fumade – sweet smoked ricotta
   Smoked hams  of Sauris, of Cormons and of the Carso plateau
   Speck friulano of Sauris

Veneto

 Bigoli con l'arna – a type of pasta similar to Tagliatelle but bigger with a sauce of liver of the duck
 Galani or Crostoli – pastries
 Lesso e pearà – boiled meats with pepper sauce, most common in the Province of Verona
 Pasta e fagioli – a soup of pasta and beans
 Polenta e osei – polenta accompanied with roasted wild birds
 Radicchio e pancetta – raw or cooked radicchio salad with pancetta
 Risi e bisi – rice with young peas
 Sarde in saor – fried, marinated sardines

Trentino-Alto Adige/Südtirol

 Carne salada e fasoi – aromatized salt beef with beans
 Crauti – Sauerkraut
 Minestrone di orzetto –  barley soup
 Speck –  is a type of salume from the historical-geographical region of Tyrol and generally obtained from pork leg subjected to a process of cold-smoking
 Strangolapreti – spinach dumplings
 Spatzle – typical Trentino Alto Adige first course, similar to Strangolapreti in flavour, different in form
 Zelten – a typical dessert of the Christmas tradition of the Trentino-Alto Adige region. Made with dried fruit (pine nuts, walnuts, almonds) and candied fruit
 Grostoli – in dialect "Grostoi" (Grøśtœį) tyopical fried dessert from the Trentino-Alto Adige culture
 Strauben – Austro-Hungarian culinary artefact, served in every alpine hut with plenty of "currant jam" (Marmelada de ribes) on top

Lombardy

 Mostarda di Cremona – a sweet/spicy sauce made with candied fruits and meant to be served along boiled beef.
 Nocciolini di Canzo – small sweet amaretto-style biscuits with hazelnut flour
 Panettone – a Milanese Christmas traditional sweet bread made with a yeast and egg dough along with candied citrus peel, and raisins
 Pizzoccheri – buckwheat tagliatelle dressed with potatoes, greens (often Swiss Chard or Spinach), butter and Bitto cheese: a speciality of the Valtellina.
 Risotto alla milanese – A stirred rice dish made with Vialone or Carnaroli rice flavored with saffron and beef marrow
 Torrone – a candy made of honey, sugar, and egg white, with toasted almonds or hazelnuts
 Tortelli di zucca – ravioli with a squash filling
 Salame di Varzi

Val D'Aosta
 Tortino di riso alla valdostana – rice cake with ox tongue
 Zuppa di Valpelline – savoy cabbage stew thickened with stale bread

Piedmont (Piemonte)

 Bagna càuda – A hot dip based on anchovies, olive oil and garlic (sometimes blanched in milk), to accompany vegetables (either raw or cooked), meat or fried polenta sticks
 Bollito misto
 Brasato al vino – stew made from wine marinated beef
 Gnocchi di semolino alla romana – semolina dumpling
 Lepre in Civet – jugged hare
 Paniscia di Novara – a dish based on rice with borlotti beans, salame sotto grasso and red wine
 Panissa di Vercelli - a dish based on rice with borlotti beans, salame sotto grasso and red wine
 Panna cotta – sweetened cream set with gelatin
 Pere San Martin al vino rosso - winter pears in red wine
 Risotto alla piemontese – risotto cooked with meat broth and seasoned with nutmeg, parmesan and truffle
 Vitello tonnato – veal in tuna sauce
 Rane Fritte – fried frogs
 Riso e Rane – risotto with frogs
 Salame sotto Grasso – pork salami aged under a thick layer of lard

Liguria

 Agliata – the direct ancestor of pesto, it is a spread made from garlic cloves, egg yolk and olive oil pestled in a mortar until creamy
 Baccalà fritto – morsels of salt cod dipped in flour batter and fried
 Bagnun (literally Big Bath or Big Dip) a soup made with fresh anchovies, onion, olive oil and tomato sauce where crusty bread is then dipped; originally prepared by fishermen on long fishing expeditions and eaten with hard tack instead of bread.
 Bianchetti – Whitebait of anchovies and sardines, usually boiled and eaten with lemon juice, salt and olive oil as an entrée
 Buridda – seafood stew
 Cappon Magro – a preparation of fish, shellfishes and vegetables layered in an aspic
 Capra e fagioli - a stew made of goat meat and white beans, a typical dish of the hinterland of Imperia
 Cima alla genovese – this cold preparation features an outer layer of beef breast made into a pocket and stuffed with a mix of brain, lard, onion, carrot, peas, eggs and breadcrumbs, then sewn and boiled. It is then sliced and eaten as an entrée or a sandwich filler
 Cobeletti – sweet corn tarts
 Condigiun – a salad made with tomatoes, bell peppers, cucumber, black olives, basil, garlic, anchovies, hard boiled egg, oregano, tuna.
 Farinata di zucca – a preparation similar to chickpea farinata substituting pumpkin for the legumes' flour as its main ingredient, the end result is slightly sweeter and thicker than the original
 Galantina – similar to Testa in cassetta but with added veal.
 Latte dolce fritto – a thick milk based cream left to solidify, then cut in rectangular pieces which are breaded and fried.
 Maccheroni con la Trippa – A traditional savonese soup uniting maccheroni pasta, tripe, onion, carrot, sausage, "cardo" which is the Italian word for Swiss chard, parsley, and white wine in a base of capon broth, with olive oil to help make it satisyfing.  Tomato may be added but that is not the traditional way to make it. (Traditional ingredients: brodo di gallina o cappone, carota, cipolla, prezzemolo, foglie di cardo, trippa di vitello, salsiccia di maiale, maccheroni al torchio, vino bianco, burro, olio d'oliva, formaggio grana, sale.)
 Mescciüa – a soup of chickpeas, beans and wheat grains, typical of eastern Liguria and likely of Arab origin
 Mosciamme – originally a cut of dolphin meat dried and then made tender again thanks to immersion in olive oil, for several decades tuna has replaced dolphin meat.
 Pandolce – sweet bread made with raisins, pine nuts and candied orange and cedar skins
 Panera genovese – a kind of semifreddo rich in cream and eggs flavoured with coffee, similar to a cappuccino in ice cream form
 Panissa and Farinata – chickpea-based polentas and pancakes respectively
 Pesto – Probably Liguria's most famous recipe, widely enjoyed beyond regional borders, is a green sauce made from basil leaves, sliced garlic, pine nuts, pecorino or parmigiano cheese (or a mix of both) and olive oil. Traditionally used as a pasta dressing (especially with gnocchi or trenette, it is finding wider uses as sandwich spread and finger-food filler)
 Pizza all'Andrea – focaccia-style pizza topped with tomato slices (not sauce) onions and anchovies
 Scabeggio – fried fish marinated in wine, garlic, lemon juice and sage, typical of Moneglia
 Sgabei – fritters made from bread dough (often incorporating some cornmeal in it)
 Stecchi alla genovese – wooden skewers alternating morsels of leftover chicken meats (crests, testicles, livers...) and mushrooms, dipped in white bechamel sauce, left to dry a bit and then breaded and fried
 Testa in cassetta – a salami made from all kind of leftover meats from pork butchering (especially from the head)
 Torta di riso – Unlike all other rice cakes this preparation is not sweet, but a savoury pie made with rice, caillé, parmigiano and eggs, it can be wrapped in a thin layer of dough or simply baked until firm
 Torta pasqualina – savory flan filled with a mixture of green vegetables, ricotta and parmigiano cheese, milk and marjoram; some eggs are then poured in the already-placed filling, so that their yolks will remain whole when cooked
 Trenette col pesto – Pasta with Pesto (Olive Oil, garlic, Basil, Parmigiano and Pecorino Sardo cheese) sauce

Emilia-Romagna

 Aceto Balsamico Tradizionale di Modena (Traditional Balsamic Vinegar) and Aceto Balsamico Tradizionale di Reggio Emilia (Balsamic vinegar) – very precious, expensive and rare sweet, dark, sweet and aromatic vinegar, made in small quantities according to elaborated and time-consuming procedures (it takes at least 12 years to brew the youngest Aceto Balsamico) from local grapes must (look for the essential "Tradizionale" denomination on the label to avoid confusing it with the cheaper and completely different "Aceto Balsamico di Modena" vinegar, mass-produced from wine and other ingredients
 Borlengo from the hills South of Modena
 Cannelloni, Crespelle and Rosette – pasta filled with bechamel, cream, ham and others
 Cappellacci – large size filled egg pasta with chestnut puree and sweet Mostarda di Bologna, from Romagna.
 Cappelletti – small egg pasta "hats" filled with ricotta, parsley, Parmigiano Reggiano and nutmeg, sometimes also chicken breast or pork and lemon zest, from Emilia, in particular Reggio.
 Cappello del prete – "tricorno" hat shaped bag of pork rind with stuffing similar to zampone's, to be boiled (from Parma, Reggio Emilia and Modena)
 Ciccioli – cold meat made with pig's feet and head from Modena
 Coppa – cured pork neck form Piacenza and Parma
 Cotechino – big raw spiced pork sausage to be boiled, stuffing rich in pork rind (from Emilia provinces)
 Crescentine baked on Tigelle – (currently known also as Tigelle that is the traditional name of the stone dies which Crescentine were baked between) a small round (approx. 8 cm diameter, 1 cm or less thick) flat bread from the Modena Apennine mountains
 Crescentine – flat bread from Bologna and Modena: to be fried in pork fat or baked between hot dies (see Tigelle above)
 Culatello – a cured ham made with the most tender of the pork rump: the best is from the small Zibello area in Parma lowlands
 Erbazzone – spinach and cheese filled pie from Reggio Emilia
 Fave stufate – broad beans with mortadella
 Garganelli – typical Romagna quill shaped egg pasta usually dressed with Guanciale (cheek bacon), peas, Parmigiano Reggiano and a hint of cream.
 Gnocco Fritto – fried pastry puffs from Modena (Gnocco Fritto was a very local name: until few decades ago it was unknown even in neighbouring Emilian provinces where different denominations, i.e. Crescentine Fritte in Bologna, for similar fried puffs)
 Gramigna con salsiccia – typical Bologna short and small diameter curly pasta pipes with sausage ragù.
 Mortadella – baked sweet and aromatic pork sausage from Bologna
 Panpepato – very rich Christmas dried fruit and nut dessert with almonds, candies and a lot of sweet spices
 Parmigiano-Reggiano –  prized ancient long-aged cheese from Reggio Emilia, Parma. Modena and Bologna
 Passatelli –  noodles made of breadcrumbs, Parmigiano Reggiano, cheese, lemon zest and nutmeg from Romagna* Pesto di Modena – cured pork back fat pounded with garlic, rosemary and Parmigiano-Reggiano used to fill borlenghi and baked crescentine
 Piadina Fritta  – Fried Romagna pastry rectangles
 Piadina – Pancake shaped flat bread (from Romagna) which can be smaller and higher or larger and very thin
 Pisarei e faśö – pasta peas with beans from Piacenza
 Salame Felino – salami from Parma province
 Salamina da Sugo – soft sausage from Ferrara, seasonal.
 Spalla di San Secondo – gourmet salami from a small town near Parma; it is made with seasoned pork shoulder, stuffed in cow bladders and slowly boiled or steamed.
 Spongata – very rich Christmas time thin tart: a soft crust with flour sugar dusting, stuffed with finely broken almonds and other nuts, candies and a lot of sweet spices, from Reggio Emilia
 Squacquerone – sweet, runny, milky cheese from Romagna
 Tagliatelle all' uovo – egg pasta noodles, very popular across Emilia-Romagna; they are made in slightly different thickness, width and length according to local practise (in Bologna the authentic size of Tagliatelle alla Bolognese is officially registered at the local Chamber of Commerce)
 Torresani – roasted pigeons popular in Emilia
 Torta Barozzi o Torta Nera – barozzi tart or black tart (a dessert made with a coffee/cocoa and almond filling encased in a fine pastry dough (from Modena)
 Tortelli alla Lastra – griddle baked pasta rectangles filed with potato and pumpkin puree and sausage or bacon bits
 Tortelli – usually square, made in all Emilia-Romagna, filled with swiss chard or spinach, ricotta and Parmigiano Reggiano in Romagna or ricotta, parsley, Parmigiano Reggiano in Bologna (where they are called Tortelloni) and Emilia, or with potatoes and pancetta in the Apennine mountains
 Tortellini – small egg pasta navel shapes filled with lean pork, eggs, Parmigiano-Reggiano, Mortadella, Parma Ham and nutmeg (from Bologna and Modena: according to a legend, they were invented in Castelfranco Emilia by a peeping innkeeper after the navel of a beautiful guest)
 Zampone – stuffed pig's trotter, fat, but leaner than cotechino's, stuffing; to be boiled (from Modena)

Tuscany

 Bistecca alla fiorentina – grilled Florentine T-bone steak traditionally from the Chianina cattle breed.
 Crema paradiso – Tuscan cream
 Fegatelli di maiale – pig's liver forcemeat stuffed into pig's stomach and baked in a slow oven with stock and red wine
 Ossibuchi alla toscana – osso buco, sliced braised veal shank, "Tuscan-style"
 Pinzimonio – fresh seasonal raw or slightly blanched vegetables served with seasoned olive oil for dipping
 Ribollita – twice-cooked vegetable soup
 Lampredotto – cooked abomasum
Tuscan bread specialties
 Carsenta lunigianese – baked on a bed of chestnut leaves and served on Good Friday
 Ciaccia – from the Maremma made from maize
 Donzelle – round loaf fried in olive oil
 Fiandolone – made with sweet chestnut flour and strewn with rosemary leaves
 Filone – classic Tuscan unsalted bread
 Pan di granturco – made from maize flour
 Pan di ramerino – a rosemary bread seasoned with sugar and salt. The bread was originally served during Holy Week decorated with a cross on top and sold at the Church by semellai; it is, however, offered year round now.
 Pan maoko – equal parts wheat and maize flour, with pine nuts and raisins added
 Pane classico integrale – unsalted bread made with semolina with a crisp crust
 Pane con i grassetti – a bread from the Garfagnana area, with pork cracklings mixed in
 Pane con l'uva – in other areas this bread often takes the form of small loaves or rolls, but in Tuscany it is a rolled-out dough with red grapes incorporated into it and sprinkled with sugar. It is bread served often in the autumn in place of dessert and often served with figs
 Panigaccio – Lunigiana specialty made with flour, water and salt baked over red-hot coals and served with cheese and olive oil
 Panina gialla aretina – an Easter bread with a high fat content, containing raisins, saffron, and spices. It is consecrated in a church before being served with eggs
 Panini di Sant' Antonio – sweet rolls eaten on the feast day of St. Anthony
 Schiacciata – dough rolled out onto baking sheet and can have pork cracklings, herbs, potatoes and/or tomatoes added to the top along with a salt and olive oil
 Schiacciatina – made with a fine flour, salt dough with yeast and olive oil
 Panino co' i' lampredotto – lampredotto sandwich

Umbria
 Lenticchie di Castelluccio con salsicce – lentil stew with sausages
 Minestra di farro – spelt soup
 Piccioni allo spiedo – spit-roasted pigeon
 Regina in porchetta – carp in fennel sauce

Specialties of the Norcineria (Umbrian Butcher)
 Barbozzo – cured, matured pig's cheek
 Budellacci – smoked, spiced pig intestines eaten raw, spit-roasted, or broiled
 Capocollo – Sausage highly seasoned with garlic and pepper
 Coppa – sausage made from the pig's head
 Mazzafegati – sweet or hot pig's liver sausage, the sweet version containing raisins, orange peel and sugar
 Prosciutto di Norcia – a pressed, cured ham made from the legs of pigs fed on a strict diet of acorns

Marche
 Brodetto di San Benedetto del Tronto – fish stew, San Benedetto del Tronto-style, with green tomatoes and sweet green pepper.
 Brodetto di Porto Recanati – fish stew, without tomato, wild saffron spiced.
 Olive all'ascolana – fried stoned olives stuffed with pork, beef, chicken, eggs and Parmesan cheese in Ascoli Piceno.
 Passatelli all'urbinate – spinach and meat dumplings

Unique ham and sausage specialties
 Coppa – coppa in this region refers to a boiling sausage made from pig's head, bacon, orange peel, nutmeg and sometimes pinenuts or almonds.  It is meant to be eaten within a month of preparation
 Ciauscolo – made from the belly and shoulder of pig with half its weight in pork fat and seasoned with salt, pepper, orange peel and fennel. It is stuffed into an intestine casing, dried in a smoking chamber and cured for three weeks.
 Fegatino – a liver sausage with pork belly and shoulder, where the liver replaces the fat of other sausages
 Mazzafegato di Fabriano – mortadella made from fat and lean pork with liver and lung added to the fine-grained emulsification. It is seasoned with salt and pepper, stuffed into casings and smoked. This sausage is often served at festivals.
 Prosciutto del Montefeltro – made from free-range black pigs, this is a smoked Prosciutto washed with vinegar and ground black pepper
 Salame del Montefeltro – made from the leg and loin meat of the black pig, this sausage is highly seasoned with peppercorns and hung to dry
 Salame di Fabriano – similar to salame lardellato except that it is made solely from leg of pork with pepper and salt
 Salame lardellato – made with lean pork shoulder, or leg meat, along with diced bacon, salt, pepper, and whole peppercorns.  It is cased in hog's intestines, dried for one-and-a-half days and then placed in a warm room for 3–4 days, two days in a cold room and then two months in a ventilated storage room
 Soppressata di Fabriano – finely emulsified pork flavored with bacon, salt and pepper, the sausage is smoked and then aged

Lazio

 Bucatini all'amatriciana – bucatini with guanciale, tomatoes and pecorino
 Carciofi alla giudia – artichokes fried in olive oil, typical of Roman Jewish cooking
 Carciofi alla Romana – artichokes Roman-style; outer leaves removed, stuffed with mint, garlic, breadcrumbs and braised
 Coda di bue alla vaccinara – oxtail ragout
 Pasta alla gricia
 Saltimbocca alla Romana – Veal cutlet, Roman-style; topped with raw ham and sage and simmered with white wine and butter
 Spaghetti alla carbonara – spaghetti with eggs, guanciale and pecorino

Abruzzo  and Molise
 Agnello casc' e ove – Lamb stuffed with grated Pecorino cheese and eggs
 Agnello con le olive –
 Arrosticini – skewered pieces of meat
 Maccheroni alla chitarra – a narrow stripped pasta served with a sauce of tomatoes, bacon and Pecorino cheese
 Maccheroni alla molinara - also la pasta alla mugnaia is a long (single) hand made pasta served with tomato sauce
 Mozzarelline allo zafferano – mini mozzarella cheese coated with a batter flavored with saffron
 Parrozzo - a cake-like dessert made from a mixture of flour and crushed almonds, and coated in chocolate
 Pizza Dolce - A layered (with two or three cream fillings - white custard, chocolate or almond) sponge cake, that is soaked with alchermes (if you can find it) or rum.
 Pizzelle - (also known as Ferratelle). A thin, cookie made with a waffle iron device, often flavored with anise.
 Spaghetti all' aglio, olio e peperoncino
 Scripelle 'Mbusse - Abruzzo crêpes (flour, water and eggs), seasoned with Pecorino cheese, rolled and served in chicken broth.
 Sugo di castrato – mutton sauce made with onion, rosemary, bacon, white wine, and tomatoes
 Timballo teremana - A "lasagne" made with scripelle (Abruzzo crêpes) layered with a ragout of beef, pork, onion, carrot and celery, also layered with mushrooms, crumbled hard boiled egg, peas and besciamella.

Campania

 Braciole di maiale – Pork loin with tomatoes sauce, garlic, capers and pine nuts
 Caponata di pesce – Fish Caponata; bread (baked in the shape of a donut), anchovies, tuna, lemon juice, olive oil and pepper
 Casatiello – Neapolitan Easter pie with Parmesan cheese, Pecorino cheese, eggs, salame, bacon, and pepper
 Gattò – A Neapolitan potato casserole with ham, Parmesan cheese and Pecorino cheese.
 Graffe – fried Neapolitan "doughnuts" made with flour, potato, yeast and sugar.
 Insalata caprese – salad of tomatoes, Mozzarella di Bufala (buffalo mozzarella) and basil
 Limoncello – Lemon liqueur
 Maccheroni alla napoletana – macaroni with Neapolitan sauce; a sauce of braised beef, carrot, celery, onion, garlic, white wine, tomato paste and fresh basil.
 Melanzane a Scapece – Scapece eggplant; marinated eggplant with red pepper and olive oil
 Melanzane al cioccolato – mid-August dessert; eggplants with chocolate and almonds
 Mozzarella di Bufala Campana – Particular variety of cheese products made exclusively with milk from buffalo
 Mozzarella in carrozza – fried mozzarella with slices of toasted bread and olive oil
 Mustacciuoli – Neapolitan Christmas dessert; cookies with almonds and coffee covered with chocolate
 Parmigiana – Sliced eggplant pan fried in oil, layered with tomato sauce and cheese, and baked in an oven
 Pastiera napoletana – Neapolitan ricotta cake
 Pepata di cozze – Mussel and Clam soup with tomato sauce, served with slices of toasted bread.
 Pizza napoletana – neapolitan pizza; the most popular is "Pizza Margherita": pizza topped with tomatoes sauce, mozzarella cheese, Parmesan cheese, basil and olive oil
 Polipo alla Luciana – Luciana Octopus; octopus with tomatoes sauce, chopped tomatoes, olives and garlic
 Ragù napoletano – Neapolitan ragù; tomatoes sauce, onions, olive oil, carrots, celery, veal shank, pork ribs, lard, basil, salt and pepper
 Roccocò – Neapolitan Christmas dessert; almond crunch cookies
 Sartù di riso – Rice Sartù; rice with mushrooms, onions, tomato-paste, beef, peas, Parmesan cheese and Mozzarella cheese and olive oil
 Sfogliatelle – Neapolitan ricotta dessert; seashell-shaped pastry with ricotta cheese.
 Sfogliatella Santarosa – Neapolitan dessert; Slightly larger than a traditional sfogliatella, it is filled with a crema pasticciera and garnished with crema di amarene (sour black cherry)
 Spaghetti alle vongole – Spaghetti with clams in a white sauce with garlic, olive oil and pepper
 Struffoli – Neapolitan Christmas dessert; honey balls with lemon juice and colored candy
 Torta caprese – Chocolate cake with almonds
 Zeppole di San Giuseppe –  Fritters for Saint Joseph's Day; Cream-filled with crema pasticciera

Apulia (Puglia)

 Burrata – an Italian cow milk cheese (occasionally buffalo milk) made from mozzarella and cream. The outer casing is solid cheese, while the inside contains stracciatella and cream, giving it an unusual, soft texture. It is typical of Apulia.
 Caciocavallo podolico – a variety of cheese products made exclusively with Podolica cow milk.
 Cacioricotta – a cheese produced throughout Apulia.
Calzone (in Lecce) or Panzerotto (in Bari and Taranto) - puff pastry with oil which in its typicality contemplated the use of olives, ham, onions, mozzarella, cheese and tomato sauce for filling. Cooked either in the oven as savory pie, or deep fried
 Cartellate – a pastry, particularly prepared around Christmas, made of a thin strip of a dough made of flour, olive oil, and white wine that is wrapped upon itself, intentionally leaving cavities and openings, to form a sort of "rose" shape; the dough is then deep-fried, dried, and soaked in either lukewarm vincotto or honey.
 Muscisca – bacon or boneless meat from sheep or goat (and in some cases veal), which is cut into long (20–30 cm) and thin (3–4 cm) strips, and seasoned with salt, chili, and fennel seeds before being sun-dried.
 Orecchiette alle cime di rapa – Ear-like pasta with rapini.
 Ostriche arrosto – oysters broiled with parsley, garlic, oregano, breadcrumbs, olive oil, and lemon juice.
 Pancotto – an ancient dish of Capitanata, made from a base of stale bread and accompanied with a wide variety of wild vegetables, fennel seeds, oil of Tavoliere, and chili peppers.
Pasticciotto leccese - shortcrust pastry shell and a custard heart.
Pitta di patate - potato focaccia stuffed with tomatoes, onions, bacon, mozzarella, parsley, and covered with breadcrumbs
 Purea di fave (or fave e cicorie, also known as "fave e fogghije", fava beans and leaves) – fava bean puree with stewed cicory. During Christmas festivities, cicory is stewed in red wine instead of water.
 Riso, patate e cozze or Tiella barese – a Bari specialty made with rice, potatoes, and mussels, similar to paella, cooked in an earthenware pan or in the oven. It has a Salento variant called Tajeddha. It is likely that this recipe is a variant of Paella given the long Spanish domination in the kingdom of Naples.
Rustico leccese - typical street food of Salento: a puff pastry filled with béchamel, mozzarella and tomato
Sagne 'ncannulate or  sagne torte - home made pasta typical of Salento in the shape of long lagane rolled up on themselves that are served with fresh tomato sauce, basil and cacio-ricotta (someone adds a little breadcrumbs to dry any residual draining water), others use ricotta-shcante (a spicy ricotta cream), or with meat sauce (pork or lamb) with the addition of chilli, to taste.
 Tiella di verdure – a casserole of baked vegetables topped with mozzarella cheese and fresh basil.
 Torcinelli – lamb intestines wrapped around lamb liver or offal, typically testicles, generally grilled on a skewer, sometimes stewed in tomato and onions.
 Zuppa di cozze alla Tarantina – mussels steamed with peperoncino, garlic, tomatoes, and white wine. Often eaten with short pasta types. Variations prepared in the hinterland of Taranto may include white beans or kidney beans.

Apulian bread specialties
Focaccia ripiena – a bread made of dough filled with mozzarella, tomatoes, ham, onion or leek, and served in slices.
 Friselle – a bread made from barley flour and durum wheat flour, which goes through a dual baking process becoming very similar to hardtack, and is soaked in water before being prepared and eaten.
 Pane casereccio – a bread made from durum wheat, yeast, flour, salt, and water.
Puccia con le olive - a bread filled with olives
Puccia di pane – a bread made in honor of the Virgin Mary. It is a small, soft, round loaf made of white flour.
 Puddica – bread dough mixed with mashed potato and rolled into flat cakes, covered with halved tomatoes and seasoned with salt and pepper
Taralli – a ring-shaped snack food which can be sweet or savory.

Basilicata

 Agnello alla pastora – Lamb with potatoes.
 Baccalà alla lucana – Cod with crunchy red peppers.
 Ciaudedda – Stew with artichokes, potatoes, broad beans and pancetta
 Orecchiette con la salsiccia piccante – Ear-like pasta with typical spicy salami from Basilicata
 Pecorino di Forenza – Cheese made of sheep's milk, typical of the Forenza area.
 Pasta con i peperoni cruschi – Pasta dish served with peperoni cruschi (crispy peppers), fried bread crumb and cacioricotta.
 Pasta mollicata – Pasta dish served with tomato, onion dipped in red wine, lard and cacioricotta.
 Pollo alla potentina – Potenza-style chicken; Chicken braised with tomatoes, onion, white wine, peperoncino, topped with fresh basil, parsley and pecorino cheese.
 Rafanata – Type of omelette with horseradish, potatoes and cheese.
 Tumact me tulez – Pasta dish served with tomato, anchovy, fried bread crumb and chopped walnuts.
 U' pastizz 'rtunnar – Baked turnover filled with pork, eggs and cheese.

Calabria

 Caciocavallo A very milky cheese
 Cuzzupa
 Insalata Pomodoro A tomato salad with hot pepper
 Maccarruni i'casa home made pasta with goat or pork meat and tomatoes
 Melanzane alla menta – Eggplant marinated with mint
 Melanzane ripiene – Stuffed Eggplant
 Nduja – A spicy preserved meat, similar to the French Andouille
 Pesce spada alla ghiotta – swordfish rolls in tomato sauce
 Pipi chini padded pepper
 pisci stoccu Stockfish with olive, tomatoes and caper bush
 satizzu  typical sausages made with fennel and pepper (The prototypical "Italian" sausage as sold in the United States)
 Soppressata A uniquely Calabrian salami
 Zippuli

Sicily (Sicilia)

 Arancini – stuffed rice balls which are coated with breadcrumbs and fried.
 Cannoli – shortcrust pastry cylinder shell filled with sweet ricotta, mascarpone or chocolate or vanilla cream.
 Caponata – eggplants with tomatoes and olives
 Cous Cous trapanese
 Il timballo del gattopardo – Sicilian pie; pastry dough baked with a filling of penne rigata, Parmesan, and bound a sauce of ham, chicken, liver, onion, carrot, truffles, diced hard-boiled egg and seasoned with clove, cinnamon, salt and pepper.  Gattopardo (the Serval) makes reference to the arms of the Lampedusa family and Giuseppe Tomasi di Lampedusa's well-known novel Il Gattopardo, not the contents of the dish.
 Granita - semi-frozen dessert made from sugar, water and various flavorings, typically lemon or almond or caffè or mulberry
 Maccu di San Giuseppe – bean paste with fennel.
 Pantesca salad - dish of the island of Pantelleria.
 Pasta alla Norma - Spaghetti with tomato and eggplant.
 Panelle – a Sicilian chickpea fritter, often eaten as a sandwich and popular as street food
 Scaccia – flat bread stuffed in different ways
 Sicilian pizza - pizza prepared in a manner that originated in Sicily
 Tonno alla palermitana – tuna Palermo-style; tuna marinated in white wine, lemon, garlic, rosemary and broiled, then served with pan-seared sardines

Sardinia (Sardegna)
 Casu marzu – type of cheese
 Culurgiones – a kind of ravioli
 Malloreddus – semolina gnocchi with saffron
 Pane carasau – type of bread
 Porcetto or Porceddu – small pig cooked with myrtle
 Panada – a pie filled with meat or vegetables
 Zuppa Cuata – bread and cheese soup

Ingredients
Most important ingredients (see also: Italian Herbs and Spices):
 Olio extravergine di oliva (Extra-virgin olive oil)
 Parmigiano Reggiano (aged cow's-milk cheese)
 Pecorino (aged sheep's-milk cheese)
 Pomodoro (Tomato)

Other common ingredients:

 Acciughe (Anchovies, preserved in olive oil, or in salt)
 Aceto balsamico (Balsamic vinegar)
 Asparagi (Asparagus)
 Baccalà (Dried, salted cod)
 Bresaola (Air-dried salted beef)
 Broccoli
 Burro (Butter)
 Capperi (Capers, preserved in vinegar or, more frequently, salt)
 Carciofi (Artichokes)
 Cavolfiore (Cauliflower)
 Cavolo riccio (Kale)
 Ceci (Chickpeas)
 Cetrioli (Cucumber)
 Cicoria  (Chicory)
 Crauti (Sauerkraut)
 Fagioli (Beans)
 Farro (Emmer)
 Fragole (Strawberries)
 Friarielli (Broccoli rabe)
 Funghi (Porcini mushrooms, white mushrooms)
 Lardo (Lard)
 Lenticchie (Lentils)
 Limone (Lemon)
 Melanzane (Eggplants)
 Mele (Apples)
 Miele (Honey)
 Nocciole (Hazelnuts)
 Noci (Walnuts)
 Olive (Olives)
 Orzo (Barley)
 Pasta
 Patate (Potatoes)
 Pesce spada (Swordfish)
 Peperoni (Bell peppers)
 Pere (Pears)
 Pestât
 Pesto
 Pinoli (Pine nuts)
 Piselli (Peas)
 Pistacchi (Pistachios)
 Polenta
 Prosciutto
 Radicchio – Leaf chicory (Cichorium intybus, Asteraceae), sometimes known as Italian chicory. Radicchio rosso di Treviso resembles a large red Belgian endive.
 Ricotta
 Riso (Rice)
 Rucola (or Rughetta) (Rocket or Arugula)
 Seppie (Cuttlefish)
 Speck
 Spinaci (Spinach)
 Tartufo (Truffle)
 Trippa (Tripe)
 Tonno (Tuna)
 Uva (Grape)
 Zucca (Pumpkin)
 Zucchine (Zucchini)

Herbs and spices

 Aglio (Garlic)
 Alloro (Bay leaves)
 Aneto (Dill)
 Anice (Anise)
 Basilico (Basil)
 Borragine (Starflower)
 Cannella (Cinnamon)
 Capperi (Capers)
 Chiodi di garofano (Clove)
 Cipolla (Onion)
 Erba cipollina (Chives)
 Finocchio (Fennel)
 Ginepro (Juniper)
 Maggiorana (Marjoram)
 Menta (Mint)
 Mentuccia (Calamintha nepeta)
 Noce moscata (Nutmeg)
 Origano (Oregano)
 Pepe (Black pepper)
 Peperoncino (Chili pepper)
 Prezzemolo (Parsley)
 Rafano (Horseradish)
 Rosmarino (Rosemary)
 Salvia (Sage)
 Timo (Thyme)
 Zafferano (Saffron)

See also
 Italian food products
 Italian meal structure
 List of Italian chefs
 List of Italian restaurants

References

Dishes
Italian breads

Lists of foods by nationality